Gusfield is a surname. Notable people with the surname include:

Chaya Gusfield, American attorney and rabbi
Dan Gusfield, American engineer

English-language surnames